Prader may refer to:

Andrea Prader (1919–2001)
Prader–Willi syndrome
Prader scale